Sheshan is a pair of hills in western Shanghai, China.

Sheshan may also refer to:

 Sheshan Island, an island near Shanghai, China
 Sheshan Basilica on West Sheshan
 Sheshan Golf Club near Sheshan
 Sheshan Station on Shanghai's Subway Line 9, near Sheshan
 Sheshan, a minor biblical figure

Also:
 She Shan Tsuen, a village in Hong Kong